Lawrence Argent (January 24, 1957 – October 4, 2017) was a visual artist best known for his 2004 public artwork I See What You Mean at the Colorado Convention Center in Denver.

Early life
Argent was born on January 24, 1957, in Essex, England, and grew up in Australia. He studied art at the Royal Melbourne Institute of Technology in Australia, and received his MFA in 1986, from the Rinehart School of Sculpture at the Maryland Institute, College of Art, in Baltimore, Maryland.

Career
Argent accepted a teaching position at the University of Denver School of Art and Art History in 1993; he was named as a professor emeritus in 2017.

Argent was at the forefront of a movement known as digital sculpting, using "computer-aided design software to create sculptures with once-impractical whorls, warps, swirls and bends."

Argent died of cardiac arrest on October 4, 2017.

Selected works 

 Cojones (1999)
 Library of Applause (1994)
 Whispers (2002) at the Ritchie Center, Denver
 I See What You Mean (2004), Denver
 Leap (2011) at the Sacramento International Airport
 Flowing Kiss (2013) in Columbus, Ohio
 I am here (2014) in Chengdu, China
 Venus (2017), San Francisco

References 

1957 births
2017 deaths
Artists from Denver
Australian emigrants to the United States
Maryland Institute College of Art alumni
People from Essex (before 1965)
RMIT University alumni
Sculptors from Colorado
University of Denver faculty